The Madurankuliya Wind Farm (also known as Narakkaliya Wind Farm, after its location) is a  wind farm located in Narakkaliya, bordering the Lakvijaya Power Station, in Narakkaliya, Puttalam, Sri Lanka. The facility consists of eight  wind turbines of  each.

See also 

 Electricity in Sri Lanka
 List of power stations in Sri Lanka

References

External links 
 

Wind farms in Sri Lanka
Buildings and structures in Puttalam District